Sexually induced sneezing or sex sneeze is a phenomenon characterized by sneezing during orgasm or sexual arousal.

Signs and symptoms
The person experiences sneezing as a result of sexual thoughts, arousal, intercourse, or orgasm. 

Sneezing occurs independent of external nasal stimuli or allergens, and may occur at any point during a sexual experience.

Both men and women are affected by the phenomenon.

Causes
Mahmood Bhutta, an otorhinolaryngologist at John Radcliffe Hospital, states that sexually induced sneezing may be genetically determined, and may result from the way the central nervous system is wired:

Another possible explanation concerns the existence of erectile tissue in the nose, which may become engorged during sexual arousal, triggering a sneeze. Cranial nerve zero (autonomic) is also located in the nasal cavity. Its purpose is unknown, but it is thought to play a role (or used to play a role) in detecting pheromones.

Treatment
Nasal decongestants may prevent sexually induced sneezing.

History
The phenomenon was noted as early as 1897 in 's remarks before the British Medical Association at a meeting in Montreal. It was later commented upon in print in 1901 in Gould and Pyle's Anomalies and Curiosities of Medicine:

In 2008, Mahmood F. Bhutta and Harold Maxwell performed the first full-scale investigation of the phenomenon. Before their research, the most recent mention in published research was a letter to the Journal of the American Medical Association in 1972, which involved a 69-year-old man, who had bouts of severe sneezing after orgasm. The two doctors noted that men and women often sought help or explanations for the disorder on internet chat rooms and forums. Bhutta stated that these people often felt embarrassed bringing up the disorder with a doctor, and were more comfortable seeking advice anonymously. The internet, he stated, could potentially be a new tool for medical researchers to investigate unusual or embarrassing symptoms that patients might not be comfortable discussing with their physicians.

See also
 Honeymoon rhinitis
 Photic sneeze reflex
 Snatiation

References

Sexual health
Sneeze